Yuri Lobanov (sometimes listed as Yuriy Lobanov, 29 September 1952 – 1 May 2017) was a Soviet-born Tajikistani sprint canoeist who competed from the early 1970s to the early 1980s. Competing in two Summer Olympics, he won two medals in the C-2 1000 m events with a gold in 1972 and a bronze in 1980. He was affiliated with Tadzhikiston Dushanbe.

Lobanov also won 14 medals at the ICF Canoe Sprint World Championships with ten gold (C-2 500 m: 1974, 1975; C-2 1000 m: 1974, 1977, 1979; C-2 10000 m: 1973, 1974, 1975, 1977, 1979), two silvers (C-2 500 m: 1971, C-2 1000 m: 1973), and two bronzes (C-2 500 m: 1977, C-2 1000 m: 1978).

Lobanov died on 1 May 2017, aged 64.

References

Sources

External links

1952 births
2017 deaths
Canoeists at the 1972 Summer Olympics
Canoeists at the 1980 Summer Olympics
Olympic canoeists of the Soviet Union
Olympic gold medalists for the Soviet Union
Olympic bronze medalists for the Soviet Union
Soviet male canoeists
Tajikistani male canoeists
Olympic medalists in canoeing
Sportspeople from Dushanbe
ICF Canoe Sprint World Championships medalists in Canadian
Tajikistani people of Russian descent

Medalists at the 1980 Summer Olympics
Medalists at the 1972 Summer Olympics